The fourth season of Myanmar Idol premiered on September 6, 2019 and continued until December 28, 2019. It was won by Esther Dawt Chin Sung. The fourth season was co-hosted by Kyaw Htet Aung, the latter of whom left the show after the season ended.

Regional auditions
Auditions were held in Taungoo, Hpa-an, Taunggyi, Yangon, and Mandalay from June to July 2019, and around 10,000 attended the auditions.

Structure of auditions
There are usually two stages in the audition process. The first round is casting round and they sing in front the executive producers and more are eliminated. In the second round those who survive the first stage sing in front of the judges and this is the audition shown on television. Those who gain at least two "yes" votes from the three judges then receive a golden ticket to Golden Week.

Golden Week
It featured three rounds: Round 1, Group Round, and Solo Round.  In the first round, each contestant sang individually, and after they sang, they gathered in a line. Those who impressed the judges advanced to the next round where the contestants performed in groups of four or five, singing a song together. The remaining auditionees who passed the group rounds performed their final solos to advance in the Green Mile.

Top 11 Finalists and stages
Yaw Kee, Benjamin Sum, Naw Say Say Htoo, Tan Khun Kyaw, Chu Sit Han, Htet Inzali, Hnin Ei Ei Win, Esther Dawt Chin Sung, Nay Lin Kyaw, Mooler, Aye Mya Phyu.

Color key:

Week 1: Top 11–

Week 2: Top 10 – Rock Music
There was no elimination because Naw Say Say Htoo was saved by judges.

Week 3: Top 10 – University songs
Double elimination because Naw Say Say Htoo was saved by judges in previous week.

Week 4: Top 8 – Country Music

Week 5: Top 7 – Soe Lwin Lwin's songs

Week 6: Top 6 – Winter songs

Week 7: Top 5 – Hits songs

Week 8: Top 4 + Wild Card winner – theme songs and strong music
Double elimination because Tan Khun Kyaw was returned by Wild Card.

Week 9: Finale
The Top three performed judges chose song, contestants chose themselves song and their winner’s song

Elimination Chart

Wild Card Winner
Tan Khun Kyaw was the Channel 9 wild card winner after beating Yaw Kee. The following day alongside Moo Ler, he failed to progress to the finals.

References

Myanmar Idol
2019 television seasons